Rolando Bohol (born December 25, 1965) is a Filipino former professional boxer who competed from 1984 to 1994. He held the IBF flyweight title in 1988, and challenged once for the IBF bantamweight title in 1994.

Professional career
Bohol turned professional in 1984 and got a draw on his first match. After 15 matches (13 wins and 2 draws), Bohol lost to Dadoy Andujar by a 10-round decision on September 29, 1985. His first fight outside home soil took place in Sokcho South Korea against Joon Huh on July 20, 1986.

Eleven bouts later, he won the International Boxing Federation IBF World Flyweight title on January 16, 1988, by defeating Chang Ho Choi in Manila and regained the world title back for the Philippines. Bohol defended the title successfully by defeating Cho-Woon Park by unanimous decision on May 6, 1988. Then, he lost it to Duke McKenzie in London, England on October 5, 1988.

Bohol won the Oriental & Pacific Boxing Federation OPBF Super Flyweight title against Thailand's Maphai Narachavat by a knock-out in 6 rounds. He successfully defended the title by defeating former International Boxing Federation IBF World Fyweight champion Jong-Kwan Chung August 4, 1989. In that same year, he lost the title against Tatsuya Sugi. He would later avenge this loss against Sugi via a tenth round knock-out in Honolulu, Hawaii on February 21, 1994. Aside from boxing Bohol is also an actor. He already appeared in two pictures taking the leading man role in the movie en-titled Kambal na Kamao and tv series en-titled 24 Oras. After a major car accident in Honolulu, Hawaii, which propelled Rolando's retirement plans quicker than he expected, Bohol moved to Las Vegas in 2006. Rolando Bohol currently owns an Internet electronics store operating from Las Vegas, Nevada, United States, where he resides.

References

External links
 Retired Website
 

1965 births
Living people
Flyweight boxers
World boxing champions
World flyweight boxing champions
International Boxing Federation champions
Southpaw boxers
Boxers from Negros Occidental
Filipino male boxers
Super-flyweight boxers
Bantamweight boxers